The 2018–19 DePaul Blue Demons men's basketball team represented DePaul University during the 2018–19 NCAA Division I men's basketball season. They were led by fourth-year (seventh overall with DePaul) head coach Dave Leitao and played their home games at the Wintrust Arena in Chicago as members of the Big East Conference. They finished the season 19–17, 7–11 in Big East play to finish in a three-way tie for last place. As the No. 10 seed in the Big East tournament, they lost in the first round to St. John's. They received a bid to the College Basketball Invitational where they defeated Central Michigan, Longwood, and Coastal Carolina to advance to the championship series against South Florida. There, in a best-of-three series, they lost to South Florida two games to one.

Previous season
The Blue Demons finished the 2017–18 season 11–20, 4–14 in Big East play to finish in a tie for ninth place. They lost in the first round of the Big East tournament to Marquette.

Offseason

Departures

Incoming transfers

2018 recruiting class

2019 recruiting class

Roster

Schedule and results

|-
!colspan=9 style=| Exhibition

|-
!colspan=9 style=|Non-conference regular season

|-
!colspan=9 style=| Big East regular season

|-
!colspan=9 style=| Big East tournament

|-
!colspan=9 style=| College Basketball Invitational

References

DePaul Blue Demons men's basketball seasons
DePaul
DePaul
DePaul Blue Demons men's basketball
DePaul Blue Demons men's basketball